Piccotts End is a village in Hertfordshire, England situated on the upper River Gade. While often mistaken for a hamlet, it became a village when its church – All Saints – was dedicated in 1907 and remained a place of worship until the 1970s. It is in the Dacorum Ward of Gadebridge.

Description

The village is home to several medieval cottages and a number of Georgian and Regency villas. One of these, Marchmont House, is now a pub. There is an extensively restored 19th century watermill. Piccotts End is positioned on the edge of Hemel Hempstead's extensive urban area, but careful planning has kept green space between it and the town.

The Piccotts End Pumping Station operated by Three Valleys Water takes its name from the village, but is actually located on a dedicated utility site containing water treatment works and an electricity sub-station.

Piccotts End Murals

In 1953 some unusually fine medieval wall paintings were discovered in some cottages here. The paintings date to between 1470 and 1500 and show a number of religious scenes, including the baptism of Jesus by St John (wearing camel skin complete with head and hoofs) and a scene of the Virgin Mary holding Christ's body in front of the cross. Also depicted are St Peter, St Catherine of Alexandria with her wheel and sword and St Margaret of Antioch emerging from the belly of the dragon. It is believed that these wall paintings show a link to the 'heretical' Cathar beliefs of southern France and adjacent areas of Catalonia and northern Italy. The building was also found to have a hidden room in the roof, suggesting it was a priest hole and an Elizabethan painted room in the next door cottage. In 1827 the same building had been converted into the West Herts Infirmary, the first cottage hospital, by Sir Astley Cooper, providing free medical services.

References

External links
Dacorum Landscape Character Assessment High Gade Valley, Dacorum Borough Council, 2004. Accessed April 2007
Piccotts End water treatment site Three Valleys Water.
Hertfordshire Genealogy Accessed April 2007
Inside story: Piccotts End Daily Telegraph, October 2000. Accessed April 2007
The Inquisition www.historyofengland.net - History of England. Accessed April 2007. - "The Cathars movement did indeed come to England. This was not known until about 40 years ago when a man redecorating his 1000 year old house in Piccotts End in the Hertfordshire Chilterns (35 miles north of London) came across a perfectly preserved wall painting of Cathar origin."

External links

Piccotts End Medieval wall paintings Hemel Hempstead Gazette, Local History, Questions and Answers. Includes images of the paintings. Accessed April 2007.

Villages in Hertfordshire
Dacorum